The Patriot is a fireboat operates in Tampa, Florida from 2009 to present. The vessel cost $3.8 million. She was built in Kingston, Ontario.

The vessel was paid for through a FEMA Port Security Grant.  So, in addition to being able to fight fires, her cabin is sealed, so she can respond to chemical, biological or radiological threats.

According to WFLA she has not been put into use since 2015, when her engines became fouled by barnacles.  She is propelled by waterjets.  WFLA reported fire officials were criticized that her high tech propulsion system had to be hauled out the barnacle infested water, when not it use. the barnacles have since been exterminated and the boat itself has repainted to grey and red and returned to service.

References

Fireboats of the United States